Matagi are traditional winter hunters of northern Japan. 

Matagi may also refer to:

Places
Matagi Island in northern Fiji
Ani-Matagi Station, a railway station in Akita Prefecture, Japan

Surname
Faalavelave Matagi (born 1997), a Samoan football goalkeeper
Suaia Matagi (born 1988), a New Zealand and Samoan rugby league footballer